Dr. Jean Ellis (November 23, 1946 – May 15, 2006) was an emergency department physician who practiced the latter part of his career at St. Vincent Healthcare located in Billings, Montana and was nationally known for his accomplishments as a climber.

Background
Jean Eliis M.D. was born in Esch, Luxembourg and educated in Ohio. He earned his medical degree from the University of Cincinnati in 1976 and had his family practice residency completed at the University of California, Irvine, Medical Center. Dr. Ellis worked in several emergency departments in California before moving to Billings in 1992 to work at Deaconess Billings Clinic. He joined the staff at St. Vincent Healthcare in September 1994.

Ellis made two attempts to climb Mount Everest, the world's highest mountain. In 1988, he was part of the expedition that was successful in putting the first two American women on the summit. Ellis, who also had been a long-distance runner who had previously qualified as an Olympic distance runner before he became a climber, was drawn to climbing in 1981 after seeing Mount Everest while at a seminar on Third World medicine in Nepal. Dr. Ellis qualified for the U.S. Olympic Trials as a marathon runner in 1980, the year the United States boycotted the Summer Games in Moscow.  In 1996 Dr. Ellis became the first African-American to summit an 8,000 meter peak, this being a benchmark for climbers. The peak, Cho Oyu, in Tibet, is the sixth highest mountain in the world and one of only 14 peaks higher than 8,000 meters.

Death
Dr. Ellis died on May 15, 2006 while cycling along Old Hardin Road at Dickie Road in Lockwood, Montana.

References

1946 births
2006 deaths
Luxembourgian emigrants to the United States
African-American physicians
American emergency physicians
American mountain climbers
University of Cincinnati College of Medicine alumni
University of California, Irvine alumni
Physicians from Montana
People from Esch-sur-Alzette
20th-century African-American sportspeople
21st-century African-American people